Slateford Junction was a railway junction in the small town of Slateford, Pennsylvania. It was built to connect the existing mainline of the Lackawanna Railroad, the so-called Old Road with the new Lackawanna Cut-Off. It was in service from 1911 until 1979.

When operations began on December 24, 1911, the junction merged four tracks (two main tracks and two sidings) from the Cut-Off with two from the Old Road. 

An interlocking tower at the junction opened four days before the Cut-Off itself. The junction also included a 60-foot turntable, but this saw limited use; it was dismantled in the 1930s and its pit filled in shortly thereafter. The tower closed on January 11, 1951; the switches at the junction became hand-throw with electric locks.

Today, the Pennsylvania Northeast Regional Railroad Authority (PNRRA) owns the remaining tracks at Slateford Junction as well as the right-of-way of the Cut-Off on the Pennsylvania side of the Delaware River. The Delaware Lackawanna Railroad currently operates freight trains at Slateford Junction and over the rest of the PNRRA's tracks.

As of 2022, there are plans to restore service along the Cut-Off via NJ Transit and Amtrak.

References 

Rail junctions in the United States
Rail infrastructure in Pennsylvania
Transportation in Northampton County, Pennsylvania
Lackawanna Cut-Off